My Sweet Pepper Land is a 2013 Kurdish-language internationally co-produced drama film directed by Huner Saleem. It was screened in the Un Certain Regard section at the 2013 Cannes Film Festival. It was nominated in the 7th annual Asia Pacific Screen Awards for Achievement in Directing for Huner Saleem and Best Performance by an Actress for Golshifteh Farahani.

Plot
In a remote village in Iraqi Kurdistan lives the Kurdish patriot Baran who since recently serves as a policeman. He cannot help but provoke the local villain Aziz Aga and finds himself supported by an attractive lady named Govend who works as a teacher.

Cast
 Korkmaz Arslan as Baran (as Korkmaz Arslan)
 Golshifteh Farahani as Govend
 Suat Usta as Reber
 Mir Murad Bedirxan as Tajdin
 Feyyaz Duman as Jaffar Mohammed Emin
 Tarik Akreyî as Aziz Ağa

References

External links
 

2013 films
2013 drama films
French drama films
German drama films
Kurdish-language films
Zazaki-language films
2010s French films
2010s German films